The 2012 European Boxing Olympic Qualification Tournament was held in Trabzon, Turkey from April 15 to April 21.

Qualified athletes

Qualification summary

Results

Light flyweight

Flyweight

Bantamweight

Lightweight

Light welterweight

Welterweight

Middleweight

Light heavyweight

Heavyweight

Super heavyweight

See also
 Boxing at the 2012 Summer Olympics – Qualification

References

External links
 AIBA
 Men's Light Fly 46-49kg
 Men's Fly 52kg
 Men's Bantam 56kg
 Men's Light 60kg
 Men's Light Welter 64kg
 Men's Welter 69kg
 Men's Middle 75kg
 Men's Light Heavy 81kg
 Men's Heavy 91kg
 Men's Super Heavy +91kg

Olympic Qualification
Boxing Olympic Qual
European 2012
Sport in Trabzon